Dijlah TV is an Iraqi satellite television channel based in Amman, Jordan. It is one of the most watched news channels in Iraq. It follows the Iraqi politician Mohamed Karbouli.

References

External links 
 Dijlah TV website
 Dijlah TV

Television stations in Iraq
Arab mass media
Arabic-language television stations
Television channels and stations established in 2010
Arab Spring and the media